Uma Aventura is a Portuguese television series based on the children's literature series of the same name. It first aired on SIC on October 14, 2000.

Cast

First Season (2000)
Cristóvão Campos - Chico
Manuel Moreira - Pedro
Mafalda Mendes - Teresa
Filipa Mendes - Luísa
Sandro Silva - João

Second Season  (2001)
Alexandre Personne - Chico
João Albino - Pedro
Salvador Nery - João
Mafalda Mendes - Teresa
Filipa Mendes - Luísa

Third and Fourth Seasons (2003-2006) 
Francisco Areosa - Chico
Rudy Rocha - João
Diana Figueiredo - Teresa
Maria Figueiredo - Luísa
Pedro Nolasco - Pedro

Episodes

See also
 Uma Aventura na Casa Assombrada

External links
 

2000 Portuguese television series debuts
2007 Portuguese television series endings
Portuguese children's television series